Encarnação may refer to:

 Encarnação (novel), 1893 novel by José de Alencar
 Encarnação (Lisbon), former parish in the municipality of Lisbon
 Encarnação (Lisbon Metro), station on the Lisbon Metro
 José Luis Encarnação (born 1941), Portuguese computer scientist
 Telma Encarnação (born 2001), Portuguese footballer

Portuguese-language surnames